Jean Trenchant (... – 15th-century) was a French mathematician

L'aritmetique departie en trois livres was used as a reference by Simon Stevin in the preface of Tafelen van Interest.

Works

References 

French mathematicians
15th-century deaths